Hugh Vivian Foord (born 1929), is a male former athlete who competed for England.

Athletics career
He represented England in the 6 miles race at the 1958 British Empire and Commonwealth Games in Cardiff, Wales.

He was a member of the Brighton Athletics Club.

References

1929 births
English male long-distance runners
Athletes (track and field) at the 1958 British Empire and Commonwealth Games
Living people
Commonwealth Games competitors for England